This is a list of wars involving Yugoslavia.

Kingdom of Yugoslavia (1918–1943)

Socialist Federal Republic of Yugoslavia (1943–1992)

Notes

References

Yugoslavia
Wars